Ballyroan is a suburban area within Rathfarnham, County Dublin, Ireland. It lies at the foot of the Dublin mountains, alongside Ballyboden, Butterfield, Knocklyon, Old Orchard, and Scholarstown. The townland of Ballyroan crosses civil parish and barony boundaries with roughly 114 acres of the historical townland in the civil parish of Tallaght in the barony of Uppercross, and nearly 10 acres in the civil parish of Rathfarnham in the barony of Rathdown. The modern suburb of Ballyroan has extended somewhat beyond the traditional townland boundaries.

The centre of Ballyroan contains the Ballyroan Community & Youth Centre, the Rosemount Shopping Centre, the parish church which opened in December 1967 and which possesses two murals inside by the artist, Seán Keating, and the Ballyroan public library which opened in 1986. The library closed in September 2011 and was demolished. A new library twice the size of the original was built at the same site at a cost of €2.6 million and opened on 18 February 2013.

Education
There are two secondary schools, Sancta Maria College and Coláiste Éanna, and a local Scout Group.

Transport
Ballyroan is served by the 15B bus route.

Gallery

References

Rathfarnham
Towns and villages in South Dublin (county)